Barton City is an unincorporated community in Alcona County in the U.S. state of Michigan. It is situated about 2 miles north of M-72 in the Huron National Forest on the shore of Jewel Lake.  Most of the community is within Millen Township, although nearby settlement extends north into Hawes Township. The ZIP code, 48705, serves a much larger area including large portions of Millen, Hawes, and Mitchell Township.

Barton City was the site of the main branch of the Potts Lumbering Company and the Loud Lumbering Company. First called "Mud Lake", because of its location on the shores of what is now known as Jewell Lake, a post office named Mud Lake was established on March 10, 1887, with George W. LaChapelle as postmaster. In 1912, two surveyors staying at the home of resident Frank Barton, laid out a town around the lake, sold lots, and named the town for Barton. The name of the post office was changed to Barton City on April 1, 1912.

Barton City boasts "the biggest little Fourth in the North" - a two-day festival in the city park on Fourth of July weekend including a grease pole competition, sawdust pile, a flea market and a beer tent. The city also puts on a fireworks show on the evening of July 4 every year.

References

External links 
 Clarke Historical Library, Central Michigan University, Bibliography on Alcona County

Unincorporated communities in Alcona County, Michigan
Populated places established in 1887
Unincorporated communities in Michigan